Qorveh is a village in Sarab Rural District, in the Central District of Sonqor County, Kermanshah Province, Iran. At the 2006 census, its population was 199, in 59 families.

A closely related variant of the Sonqori dialect is spoken in the village.

References 

Populated places in Sonqor County